Louis Wolf (1824 – December 12, 1887) was a member of the Wisconsin State Assembly and the Wisconsin State Senate. Wolf was a member of the Assembly during the 1864, 1874 and 1876 sessions and a member of the Senate representing the 20th District during the 1878 and 1879 sessions. He was a Democrat.

Wolf was well known as a boot and shoe dealer in Sheboygan Falls, Wisconsin.

Wolf died in Sheboygan Falls at the age of 62, and was survived by his wife and five children.

References

1825 births
1887 deaths
Democratic Party Wisconsin state senators
19th-century American politicians
Democratic Party members of the Wisconsin State Assembly